R&B Records was a British record label. It was most famous for being the label of the band Imagination. It closed down in 1987 when Imagination signed to RCA Records.

References

External links
R&B Records Discography

British record labels